Henrik Reuterdahl (11 September 1795 in Malmö – 28 June 1870 in Uppsala) was a Swedish Lutheran clergyman who served as the Church of Sweden archbishop of Uppsala from 1856 to his death.

Biography
Born in Malmö, he was orphaned at an early age and had to rely on others for his education and support. Despite this he managed to get a higher education at the Lund University in theology, philology and Church history, influenced by local academic dignities such as Erik Gustaf Geijer as well as the works of the German Schleiermacher that had just become appreciated in Lund. He later published a thorough history of the Church in Sweden (4 volumes, 1838–1866).

Reuterdahl served as an associate professor at the theological seminary until 1826 and in 1844, he became a professor of dogma. Reuterdahl was a member of the Royal Swedish Academy of Sciences from 1848 and of the Swedish Academy from 1852.

References

External links 
  Article Reuterdahl, Henrik Nordisk familjebok

1795 births
1870 deaths
People from Malmö
Lund University alumni
Lutheran archbishops of Uppsala
Lutheran bishops of Lund
Members of the Swedish Academy
Members of the Royal Swedish Academy of Sciences
19th-century Lutheran archbishops
Burials at Uppsala old cemetery
Knights of the Order of Charles XIII
Swedish Ministers of Education and Ecclesiastical Affairs